Jainagar may refer to:

 Jainagar, Bihar, a town of the Madhubani district in the Indian state of Bihar.
 Jainagar, Maharashtra, a town of the Nandurbar district in the Indian state of Maharashtra.
 Jainagar, Koderma, a village in Jharkhand
 Jainagar (community development block), in the Koderma district in the Indian state of Jharkhand.
 Jainagar, Ramgarh, a census town , in Ramgarh district, Jharkhand
 Jai Nagarkatti, an American chemist and businessman who served as the president of the Sigma Aldrich.
 Barauni–Gorakhpur, Raxaul and Jainagar lines, a set of the three railway lines in the Indian Railways.